Shortridge's multimammate mouse (Mastomys shortridgei) is a rodent species in the family Muridae.
It is native to Angola, Botswana and Namibia. Its natural habitats are moist savanna, subtropical or tropical seasonally wet or flooded lowland grassland, and swamps.

References

Mastomys
Rodents of Africa
Mammals described in 1933
Taxonomy articles created by Polbot